Halictus virgatellus is a species of sweat bee in the family Halictidae.

References

Further reading

External links

 

virgatellus
Articles created by Qbugbot
Insects described in 1901